Kjell Aartun (born 6 July 1925) is a Norwegian theologian and linguist. He is considered a leading expert on Semitic languages, particularly the Ugaritic language. He is also known for several controversial theories on runic interpretation and the origin of Minoan civilization. Aartun received a government scholarship (statsstipendiat) in 1983 and received HM The King's Medal of Merit in Gold for his scientific work in 2001. He has been a member of the Norwegian Academy of Science and Letters since 1986. He was born in Sjernarøy.

Career
Aartun obtained the Cand.theol. degree in 1954, and an additional degree in Greek in 1956. He was a Research Fellow from 1956 to 1961 and a Research Fellow/Lecturer from 1962 to 1965. Aartun was Research Fellow in West Berlin from 1965 to 1968, and Lecturer/Associate Professor at Stavanger lærerhøgskole from 1968 to 1992. He was also a Docent in Jerusalem in 1971, director of the Swedish Theological Institute in Jerusalem in 1974 and Docent of Semitic Languages at Lund University from 1976 until 1978. He obtained the dr. philos. degree in 1978, with a dissertation on the Ugaritic language in two volumes titled Die Partikeln des Ugaritischen (Kevelaer, 1974/1978).

In his extensive two-volume work on Minoan civilization, Die Minoische Schrift (Harrassowitz Verlag, 1992/1997), Aartun asserts that the ancient Minoan culture was Semitic. His book Runer i kulturhistorisk sammenheng (Pax Forlag, 1994) asserts that Runic inscriptions found in Scandinavia were written in a Semitic language. These publications have made him a controversial figure among both non-linguists and mainstream linguists since the early 1990s, with critics accusing him of producing pseudoscience.

His autobiography, Et forskerliv i Janteland ("A Researchers Life in the Country of Jante"), was published in 2004.

He is grandfather of the singer-songwriter Susanne Sundfør.

Selected publications
Die Partikeln des Ugaritischen, 2 vol., Kevelaer, Butzon & Bercker, 1974/1978
Die Minoische Schrift, 2 vol., Wiesbaden, Harrassowitz Verlag, 1992/1997
Runer i kulturhistorisk sammenheng: En fruktharhetskultisk tradisjon, Oslo, Pax Forlag, 1994
Et forskerliv i Janteland, Oslo, Kolofon, 2004

References

Linguists from Norway
Academic staff of Lund University
Members of the Norwegian Academy of Science and Letters
1925 births
Possibly living people
People from Finnøy
Recipients of the King's Medal of Merit in gold
Norwegian expatriates in Germany
Norwegian expatriates in Israel
Norwegian expatriates in Sweden